Neha Kaul is an Indian actress. She started her career with the TV show Zindagi Ka Har Rang...Gulaal and then played the role of Naina in Love Marriage Ya Arranged Marriage. In 2013, she played the role of Nazneen in Ek Thhi Naayka. In 2015, she played the role of Bhagwati in Tu Mera Hero.

She is popularly known for playing the role of Shogata Kant in the TV show Bahu Hamari Rajni Kant airing on Life OK.

Filmography
 2011: Tanu Weds Manu as Ayushi, Raja's sister
 2014: Hate Story 2 as Mandar's wife

Television
 2010–2011: Zindagi Ka Har Rang...Gulaal as Sudha
 2010–2011: Godh Bharaai as Avni
 2012–2013: Love Marriage Ya Arranged Marriage as Naina Ghelot
 2013: Ek Thhi Naayka as Nazneen
 2014: Devon Ke Dev...Mahadev as Devi Indumati
 2014:  Savdhaan India as Simmi 
 2014–2015: Tu Mera Hero as Bhagwati Agarwal
 March 14, 2016 – June 26, 2016: Dahleez as Leela
 2016–2017: Bahu Hamari Rajni Kant as Shogata Amrish Kant / Shogata Devendra Bangdu (Shogu)
 2018: Bitti Business Wali as Alankrita

References

External links
 

Living people
Indian television actresses
Year of birth missing (living people)
Indian soap opera actresses
21st-century Indian actresses